Adam Hastings (born 5 October 1996) is a Scotland international rugby union player who plays for Gloucester Rugby at the Fly-half position. He is the son of World Rugby Hall of Fame full-back Gavin Hastings.

Rugby Union career

Amateur career

Hastings played rugby at school for George Watson's College in Edinburgh and with Millfield School in Somerset, England.

He won two Scottish Schools Cup titles with George Watson's College.

Hastings was drafted to Currie in the Scottish Premiership for the 2017–18 season.

Hastings was drafted to Stirling County in the Scottish Premiership for the 2018–19 season.

Professional career

He started his professional rugby union career with Bath, signing for their academy in 2014. He went on to play for the senior side.

In April 2017 it was announced that Hastings would sign for Glasgow Warriors for season 2017–18 in a two-year contract running through to May 2019.

In September 2017, Hastings made his debut for Glasgow in their opening match of the 2017 Pro 14 Season against Connacht, assisting in a try.

In December 2020, it was confirmed that he had signed for Premiership Rugby side Gloucester from the 2021–22 season.

International career

Hastings has come through the Scottish international set-up. He was also named in the extended Scotland squad in the lead up to the 2018 Six Nations championship game vs Italy. He has gained caps at Scotland U16, Scotland U18, Scotland U19 and Scotland U20.

He received his first senior cap against Canada on 9 June 2018.

On 9 October 2019 Hastings scored two tries and kicked eight conversions in a 61–0 win over Russia at the 2019 Rugby World Cup.

He was named in Gregor Townsend's  38 man Scotland squad for the 2020 Six Nations Championship. He started against Ireland, England, Italy and France and being set to start against Wales before the COVID-19 pandemic prevented that match from going ahead.

Other sports

He has represented Scotland Schools at javelin at under 17.

Family
Hastings is the son of ex-Scotland international rugby union captain Gavin Hastings; and the nephew of ex-Scotland international rugby union player Scott Hastings.

References

External links 
profile at Gloucester Rugby
profile at Scottish Rugby

1996 births
Living people
Scottish rugby union players
Glasgow Warriors players
Bath Rugby players
Rugby union fly-halves
Rugby union players from Edinburgh
Currie RFC players
Scotland international rugby union players
Stirling County RFC players
Gloucester Rugby players
People educated at George Watson's College
People educated at Millfield